Chen Chien-liang (born 7 November 1993) is a Taiwanese road and track cyclist, who currently rides for UCI Continental team . He won the bronze medal in the points race at the 2016 Asian Cycling Championships.

Major results
2015
 National Road Championships
3rd Road race
3rd Time trial
2017
 National Road Championships
2nd Time trial
3rd Road race
 10th Overall Tour de Taiwan
2019
 2nd Road race, National Road Championships
2020
 1st  Road race, National Road Championships

References

External links

1993 births
Living people
Taiwanese track cyclists
Taiwanese male cyclists
Place of birth missing (living people)
Cyclists at the 2018 Asian Games
Asian Games competitors for Chinese Taipei
21st-century Taiwanese people